St. Paul A.M.E. Church or Saint Paul's African Methodist Episcopal Church or variations may refer to:

 St. Paul African Methodist Episcopal Church (Coatesville, Pennsylvania)
 St. Paul A.M.E. Church (Columbia, Missouri)
 St. Paul African Methodist Episcopal Church (Fayetteville, Tennessee)
 St. Paul A.M.E. Church (Raleigh, North Carolina)
 St. Paul's African Methodist Episcopal Church (Urbana, Ohio)
 St. Paul African Methodist Episcopal Church (West Palm Beach, Florida)

See also
 St. Paul's Methodist Church (disambiguation)